An eraser is a tool for removing marks made by pencil, pen, chalk or art brushes.

Eraser(s) or The Eraser(s) may also refer to:

Music
Erasers, an American punk band (1977–1981) fronted by Susan Beschta 
 The Eraser, 2006 album by Thom Yorke
 Eraser (album), a 2011 album by The Knux
 "Eraser" (No Age song), 2008
 "Eraser" (Ed Sheeran song), 2017
 "Eraser", a song on the 1994 album The Downward Spiral by Nine Inch Nails
 "Eraser", a song on the 2004 album The Arrival by Hypocrisy

Other
 Eraser (film), a 1996 film starring Arnold Schwarzenegger
 "The Eraser", an episode from the second season of MacGyver
 Eraser (software), a secure file erasure tool for Windows

See also 
 Erasure (disambiguation)
 Erase (disambiguation)